The Bound tariff rate is the most-favored-nation tariff rate resulting from negotiations under
the General Agreement on Tariffs and Trade (GATT) and incorporated as an integral
component of a country’s schedule of concessions or commitments to other World Trade Organization members.  If a country raises a tariff to a higher level than its bound rate, those
adversely affected can seek remedy through the dispute settlement process and may obtain
the right to retaliate against an equivalent value of the offending country’s exports or the
right to receive compensation, usually in the form of reduced tariffs on other products they
export to the offending country.

External links
 The list of Bound Tariffs on the WTO schedules page.
Query WTO Bound tariff data in World Integrated Trade Solution

References 

General Agreement on Tariffs and Trade